Orinoeme tricolor is a species of beetle in the family Cerambycidae. It was described by Breuning in 1959.

References

T
Beetles described in 1959